Vahdah Olcott-Bickford (October 17, 1885 – May 18, 1980) was an American astrologer and guitarist, known as "the Grand Lady of the Guitar."

Early life

She was born in Norwalk, Ohio as "Ethel Lucretia Olcott" and died as "Vahdah Olcott-Bickford Revere", having married twice.

Her family moved to Socorro and then Los Angeles when she was an infant. She started guitar lessons at the age of eight and then, by chance, met the classical guitarist George C. Lindsay and played for him when she was still just nine. This was the start of a lifelong friendship in which Lindsay first tutored her and then introduced her to the famous guitarist, Manuel Y. Ferrer. Ferrer invited her to stay with his family in Berkeley where he gave her daily lessons for a year until he died suddenly in 1904. She then returned to her family and published her first major work, Theme for variations on Nel cor più non mi sento.

Career

Olcott-Bickford moved to New York in 1911 where she began performing and teaching. Among her early students were Cornelius Vanderbilt and Bernard Baruch. She met Evangeline Adams who helped her choose her stage name, Vahdah. In 1919 she became the first woman to make a guitar recording. In 1923, she moved back to Southern California and was instrumental in founding the American Guitar Society in Los Angeles.  She taught at the Zoellner Conservatory in Los Angeles, wrote articles espousing the beauty of the guitar, and won music competitions.  Ron Purcell, late professor of music at California State University, Northridge, was her student from 1955 when he studied at the Los Angeles Conservatory of Music and Arts. He and other pupils were taught guitar playing in the music room at her house in the Hollywood Hills where she taught a technique of playing with the right hand using the pads of the fingers to pluck the strings, rather than the fingernails.

Legacy

She amassed a large library of music, journals and correspondence about the guitar and other similar instruments. Her house in the Hollywood Hills was damaged by the 1971 San Fernando earthquake and this threatened the collection. The house was condemned and moving the huge collection then took 15 men over 17 days. On her death, the collection was bequeathed to California State University, Northridge where it formed the foundation of its International Guitar Research Archive, now held in Special Collections and Archives in the University Library.

Death

She died in Los Angeles in 1980 at the age of 94.

References

1885 births
1980 deaths
American astrologers
20th-century astrologers
American classical guitarists
Guitarists from Ohio
People from Norwalk, Ohio
Women classical guitarists
20th-century women musicians
Classical musicians from Ohio
20th-century guitarists
20th-century classical musicians